Phtheochroa fulvicinctana is a species of moth of the family Tortricidae. It is found in France, Italy, Albania, Croatia, Hungary, Romania and Ukraine.

The wingspan is 12–17 mm. Adults have been recorded on wing from August to September.

The larvae feed on Limonium vulgare.

References

Moths described in 1894
Phtheochroa